Minnesota State Highway 227 (MN 227) was a  highway in north-central Minnesota, which ran from its intersection with U.S. Highway 71 and Wadena County Road 8 in Sebeka and continued east to its eastern terminus at its intersection with Wadena County Roads 12 and 14 in Nimrod near the Crow Wing River. The route was decommissioned in 2012 and it became an extension of Wadena County Road 12.

Route description
Highway 227 served as an east–west route between Sebeka and Nimrod in north-central Minnesota.

Highway 227 was also known as Minnesota Avenue in Sebeka.

The route crossed the Redeye River.

The route was legally defined as Route 227 in the Minnesota Statutes.

History
Highway 227 was authorized on July 1, 1949.

The western half of the route was paved when it was marked. The remainder was paved in 1952.

Major intersections

References

External links

Highway 227 at the Unofficial Minnesota Highways Page

227